Harry Halm (born Harry Hermann Hahn; 17 January 1901 – 22 November 1980) was a German film actor.

He was the son of director Alfred Halm and took acting lessons with Eduard von Winterstein and Hermann Vallentin. He began his stage career in 1919 at the Schauspielhaus in Potsdam.

Selected filmography
 Friend Ripp (1923)
 The Evangelist (1924)
 Chamber Music (1925)
 Strong Winds (1924)
 The Humble Man and the Chanteuse (1925)
 Love and Trumpets (1925)
 Three Waiting Maids (1925)
 The Untouched Woman (1925)
 The Fire Dancer (1925)
 If Only It Weren't Love (1925)
 Old Mamsell's Secret (1925)
 Princess Trulala (1926)
 Only a Dancing Girl (1926)
 A Sister of Six (1926)
 I Lost My Heart in Heidelberg (1926)
 Die Königin des Varietés (1927)
 Fabulous Lola (1927)
 How Do I Marry the Boss? (1927)
 My Heidelberg, I Can Not Forget You (1927)
 Vacation from Marriage (1927)
 The Serfs (1928)
 Two Red Roses (1928)
 The Blue Mouse (1928)
 Mariett Dances Today (1928)
 The Missing Wife (1929)
 Her Dark Secret (1929)
 The Model from Montparnasse (1929)
 Hocuspocus (1930)
 Love's Carnival (1930)
 The Blonde Nightingale (1930)
 The True Jacob (1931)
Errant Husbands (1931)
 At Your Orders, Sergeant (1932)
 A Mad Idea (1932)
 Chauffeur Antoinette (1932)
 Love Must Be Understood (1933)
 The Forester's Daughter (1952)
 The White Horse Inn (1952)
 Alraune (1952)
 The Imaginary Invalid (1952)
 Son of St. Moritz (1954)
 The Royal Waltz (1955)
 The Daring Swimmer (1957)

Bibliography
 Bergfelder, Tim & Bock, Hans-Michael. ''The Concise Cinegraph: Encyclopedia of German. Berghahn Books, 2009.

External links

1901 births
1980 deaths
German male stage actors
German male film actors
German male silent film actors
Male actors from Berlin
20th-century German male actors